Bowden Hall is a historic building on the campus of Western New Mexico University in Silver City, New Mexico. It was built as a men's dormitory in 1928, and it was named in honor of a member of the board of regents. The bedrooms were later repurposed as classrooms. It was designed in the Mission Revival architectural style by Trost & Trost. It has been listed on the National Register of Historic Places since September 22, 1988.

References

	
National Register of Historic Places in Grant County, New Mexico
Mission Revival architecture in New Mexico
School buildings completed in 1928
School buildings on the National Register of Historic Places in New Mexico
Western New Mexico University
1928 establishments in New Mexico